"Dazz" is a song by R&B/funk band Brick.  "Dazz" is a combination of disco, funk and jazz, hence the title "Dazz", a combination denominator for "Disco Jazz". Released in 1976 from their debut album Good High, it would become their biggest hit, spending four weeks at the top of the R&B singles chart, while reaching number three on the Billboard Hot 100 and number 41 on Billboards year-end chart. In Canada, it reached number 26.

Another popular 1970s-era soul group, the Dazz Band, took their name from the song.

References

1976 songs
1976 singles
Brick (band) songs
Bang Records singles